The Most Illustrious Royal Family Order of Kedah (Bahasa Melayu: Darjah Kerabat Yang Amat Mulia Kedah) is an honorific order of the Sultanate of Kedah.

History 
It was founded by Sultan Abdul Halim of Kedah on 21 February 1964.

Classes 
It is awarded in one class: 
  Member - DK

Insignia 
 The sash of the order is yellow with red and green side stripes and is worn from the left shoulder to the right hip

Notable recipients 

Sultan Abdul Halim of Kedah, (Sultan Of Kedah)  (Yang di-Pertuan Agong) of Malaysia: 
  Founding Grand Master and Member of the Royal Family Order of Kedah (DK, since 21 February 1964)

Members of the Royal Family of Kedah : 
  Member of the Royal Family Order of Kedah :
Tuanku Bahiyah DMN SMN DK DKH SPMK (1st wife of the Sultan Abdul Halim) (DK, 9.1.2004)  
 Sultanah Haminah of Kedah DMN DK DKH (consort of Almarhum Sultan Abdul Halim) (DKH, 16.7.2008)  
 Tunku Abdul Malik, Raja Muda DK DKH DMK SPMK PSB (1st younger brother of the Sultan and heir prince of Kedah) (DKH, 22.2.1976) 
 Sallehuddin of Kedah, 28th Sultan Of Kedah (DK, 15.1.2017)
 Sultanah Maliha of Kedah, consort of Sultan Salehuddin of Kedah (DK, 21.1.2018)

Malaysian Sultans : 
  : 
 Jaafar of Negeri Sembilan, late Yang di-Pertuan Besar (8 April 1967 – 27 December 2008)
 Tunku Ampuan Najihah, of Negeri Sembilan
 Muhriz of Negeri Sembilan (DK, 17.1.2010), current Yang di-Pertuan Besar 
  : 
 Putra of Perlis, late Raja of Perlis (1945 - 2000)
 Sirajuddin of Perlis (DK, 21.1.2002), current Raja of Perlis (2000 - )
  : 
 Mahmud of Terengganu, late Sultan of Terengganu (1979 - 1998)
 Mizan Zainal Abidin of Terengganu (DK, 21.1.2002), current Sultan of Terengganu (1998 - )
 Sultanah Nur Zahirah, Sultanah of Terengganu (DK, 2008)
 
 Ismail of Johor, late Sultan of Johor (8.5.1959 - 10.5.1981)
 Iskandar of Johor, late Sultan of Johor (11.5.1981 - 22.1.2010)
 Tunku Puan Zanariah, former Sultanah of Johor, consort of Sultan Iskandar
 Ibrahim Ismail of Johor (DK, 25.2.2018), current Sultan of Johor (2010 - )
 
 Yahya Petra of Kelantan, late Sultan of Kelantan (10.7.1960 – 29.3.1979)
 Ismail Petra of Kelantan, late Sultan of Kelantan (30.3.1979 – 13.9.2010)
 Raja Perempuan Tengku Anis, former Raja Perempuan of Kelantan, consort of Sultan Ismail Petra
 Muhammad V of Kelantan (DK, 26.3.2012), current Sultan of Kelantan (2010 - )

Malaysian Leader : 
 Mahathir Mohamad (DK, 20.1.2003), former Prime Minister of Malaysia

Lists of recipients 
 List of honours of the Kedah Royal Family by country
 List of Honours of Kedah awarded to Heads of State and Royals
 Category: Members of the Royal Family Order of Kedah

References 

Orders, decorations, and medals of Kedah